Admiral Sir Walter Thomas Couchman,  (19 March 1905 – 2 May 1981) was a Royal Navy officer who served as Vice Chief of the Naval Staff from February to November 1960, when he retired from service.

Early life
The son of Malcolm Edward Couchman, a civil servant in British India, and Emily Elizabeth Ranking, Walter Couchman was born in Madras in 1905.
Educated at the Royal Naval College, Osborne, Couchman joined the Royal Navy and specialized in naval aviation, after training at the Britannia Royal Naval College, Dartmouth.

Naval career
Couchman attended staff college at the Royal Naval College, Greenwich in 1928 and qualified as a naval pilot in 1935.

He served in the Second World War as Commander in the Air Materials Division and then as Commanding Officer of the destroyer . In 1941 he was appointed Staff Officer (Plans) for the Mediterranean Fleet. Later in the War he became Naval Assistant (Underwater Weapons) and then Chief Staff Officer to the Flag Officer Air (Home).

After the War he became Captain of the aircraft carrier  and then, from 1947, Director of Naval Air Organisation and Training at the Admiralty.

He went on to be Flag Officer, Flying Training in 1951, in which role he led the Fleet Air Arm flypast of 327 aircraft at the Coronation review of the fleet, flying a de Havilland Sea Vampire. He was then appointed Flag Officer, Heavy Squadron in 1953, Flag Officer, Aircraft Carriers in 1954 and Deputy Controller of Supplies (Air) at the Ministry of Supply in 1955. He became Flag Officer, Air (Home) in 1957 and Vice Chief of the Naval Staff in 1960. He retired in November 1960.

Family
He married Phyllida Connellan; they had a son and two daughters. Following the dissolution of his first marriage, he married Hughe Thelma Hunter Blair née Reid in 1965. After the death of Hughe in 1972, he married Daphne Harvey, the widow of a naval captain.

References

External links
 - photograph of Couchman on promotion to admiral in 1959, seated in the cockpit of a Hawker Sea Hawk.

1905 births
1981 deaths
People from Chennai
Royal Navy admirals
Knights Commander of the Order of the Bath
Commanders of the Royal Victorian Order
Companions of the Distinguished Service Order
Officers of the Order of the British Empire
Royal Navy officers of World War II
Lords of the Admiralty
People educated at the Royal Naval College, Osborne
Military personnel of British India
British people in colonial India